Scott Jensen may refer to:

 Scott Jensen (Wisconsin politician) (born 1960), member of the Wisconsin State Assembly 
 Scott Jensen (Minnesota politician) (born 1954), member of the Minnesota Senate